The "Design the 1988 Wish Book Cover" contest, sponsored by Sears, was a nationwide challenge for all children ages four to eleven giving them a chance to have their artwork displayed on the cover of the Christmas Wish Book, Sears' annual Christmas gift catalog. The winner of this contest would be the youngest person to ever design one of Sears' covers and would go on to join the ranks of other Sears cover artists such as Norman Rockwell, George Innes and Andrew Loomis.
Entry forms for the design contest were located inside all of Sears 1988 Spring General Catalogs and at all order desks across America.

Judging for the contest was in three age groups: four to five; six to eight; and nine to eleven. Over 30,000 children entered the contest and every state had a winner in each age group for a total of 150 nationally. Three national winners were selected from the 150 state finalists, one in each age group, and from them, one design titled "Christmas Wishes" was chosen as the Grand Prize winning design and was displayed on the cover of the 1988 Sears Wish Book.

The names and hometowns of all 150 state finalists were printed throughout the pages of the 1988 Christmas Wish Book.

References
 1988 Sears Wish Book Cover
 1988 Sears Wish Book (page 3)
 
 

Sears Holdings